Joe Jeffries (born August 16, 1981) is an American politician who served as a member of the West Virginia House of Delegates from the 22nd district. Elected in November 2018, he assumed office on December 1, 2018 and resigned in 2022.

Early life and education 
Jeffries was born in Des Moines, Iowa in 1981. He moved to WV with his parents when he was an infant. He earned a certification from the Pittsburgh Institute of Aeronautics after completing their truck driving program in 2008.

Career 
Outside of politics, Jeffries has worked as a maintenance manager and truck driver. He was elected to the West Virginia House of Delegates in November 2018 and assumed office on December 1, 2018. Jeffries served as the vice chair of the Fire Departments and Emergency Medical Services Committee until he was removed.

In the state legislature, Jeffries currently sponsors a bill that would forbid the displays and teaching of sexuality in public schools.

Jeffries was stripped of his committee assignment after he posted a sexually explicit video on social media.

References 

1981 births
People from Des Moines, Iowa
Republican Party members of the West Virginia House of Delegates
Living people